The Ukrainian football champions are currently identified at the annual football competition of the Ukrainian Premier League which is a top league football competition in the country since 2008. 

The history of the title could be traced to 1921 in varying forms of competition as full-pledged nationwide competitions within the Ukrainian SSR (before it officially joined the Soviet Union). 

The current champions Dynamo Kyiv has won a record 29 championship titles including 13 Soviet Union titles.

Historical outlook
The first national (or rather republican) Ukrainian football championship took place in 1921, just before the official establishment of the Soviet Union. The competition was known as the football championship of cities. It has developed out of a similar tournament that previously took place in the Russian Empire (1912). The detailed information about football competitions in 1920s and early 1930s is scarce. Remarkable is the fact that the dominant team (or teams) of that period was from Kharkiv which until 1934 was the capital of the Soviet pseudo state, Ukrainian SSR. During that time main cities of Ukraine were conducting own annual competitions among which were Kyiv, Kharkiv, Odesa, at the same time in the east Ukraine existed a separate regional competition of Donets basin (Donbas). Winners of those regional competitions qualified for the football championship of cities, hence the name of the tournament.

Football in the West Ukraine has developed as part of the Central European football competitions that later sprang out of the dissolution of Austria-Hungary. Interrupted by the World War I, later it was completely abolished after the Polish occupation of Ukraine at the end of Polish-Ukrainian War. After Polish occupation Ukrainian clubs of West Ukraine that at first were conducting own competitions eventually joined the Polish Football Association among which are Ukraina Lwow, USC Skala Stryi and several others. 

In 1936 there was established the Soviet professional football competitions, while the Ukrainian football competitions were integrated within the Soviet competition as republican and declassed to lower tiers. At the same time about three to six of the best clubs from the Soviet Ukraine competed in the Soviet Top League with Dynamo Kyiv competing in it consistently since its establishment. At same time until 1950s the Ukrainian Cup (Cup of the Ukrainian SSR) involved participation of all Ukrainian clubs regardless in which league they competed.

In 1959 a big reform occurred in the Soviet football and champion of Ukrainian football competitions was identified at the Class B football competitions for Ukraine which at first was the second and later the third tier. The Ukrainian football champions of the Soviet Union were not only unknown outside of the Soviet Union, but were also barely recognized within the Union. Nonetheless, over the span of years the Ukrainian club football was very competitive. FC Dynamo Kyiv won the record number of the Soviet top league titles and was the best Soviet club at the European club competitions. In 1991 Soviet Top League there was equal number of Ukrainian and Russian clubs in the league.

Finally after securing its independence in 1992, Ukraine conducts own national league competitions which are recognized worldwide.

List of winners before club competitions

Football competitions among Soviet clubs and Soviet sports societies

Best Ukrainian clubs in all-Union competitions
List of the best Ukrainian clubs in the top Soviet competitions
† — Soviet tier 1
‡ — Soviet tier 2
(no sign) — Soviet tier 3

List of winners of Ukrainian republican football competitions

List of winners since the post-Soviet independence

Vyshcha Liha

Premier League

Note: the Rank column shows the ranking of the league amongst members of UEFA.

Performance by club
Performance by club since 1992.

Note: Defunct teams marked in Italics.

Separate notes about Soviet clubs
 FC Chornomorets Odesa, historically traces its lineage based on performance of Chornomorets only as a team of Black Sea Shipping Company with 1959 being the date of the club's establishment. 
Since the club was acquired by Leonid Klimov, the club has also assumed history of other sports societies such as the city's trade union Kharchovyk (Pischevik), and later both FC Dynamo Odesa and Metalurh Odesa.
 FC Zorya Luhansk, always keeps the history of football club of Luhanskteplovoz, while existence of sports association of students Trudovi Rezervy also was mentioned
 FC Metalist Kharkiv, always keeps the history of football club of Malyshev Factory, while existence of the Southern Railways Lokomotyv also was mentioned, yet FC Dynamo Kharkiv not at all
 FC Dnipro, keeps history of the Yuzhmash's football club Dnepr, part of the Soviet Zenit sports society and successor of Metalurh sports society of the local Petrovsky factory that existed since 1925 as Stal. Since dissolution of the Soviet Union, historical claims were laid for club that existed since 1918.

See also
 Football in Ukraine
 Ukrainian football league system
 Soviet Top League

Notes

References and notes

External links
 Football Federation of Ukraine
 Official national league website

Ukrainian Premier League
Ukraine
champions